The brad-eyed sandslider (Lerista robusta) is a species of skink found in Western Australia.

References

Lerista
Reptiles described in 1990
Taxa named by Glen Milton Storr